Khalid Abdi Mohammed (born 1998) is an English footballer who played for Bury as a midfielder.

Career
Born in Manchester, Mohammed came through the academy at Bury and was offered a youth team contract on 12 March 2014.

He was first included in a matchday squad on 12 September 2015, remaining an unused substitute in a 1–0 League One win over Port Vale at Gigg Lane. On 24 October, he made his debut, replacing the injured Nathan Cameron for the final six minutes of a 2–0 loss at Shrewsbury Town.

References

External links
 

1998 births
Living people
Footballers from Manchester
English footballers
Association football midfielders
Bury F.C. players
English Football League players